Daniel Peter James Chesters (born 4 April 2002) is an English professional footballer who plays as a midfielder for West Ham United.

Club career
A youth product of Stevenage Blue Socks, he joined the academy of West Ham United at under-8 level. He started playing with their U23 development team in 2018 as a 15 year old, signing his first professional contract with the club on 16 June 2021. He made his professional debut with West Ham on 21 October 2021, coming on as a late substitute in a 3–0 UEFA Europa League group stage win over Genk.
On 26 August 2022, Chesters joined Colchester United on-loan for the remainder of the 2022-23 season.

In January 2023, Chesters was recalled by West Ham having made 18 league and cup appearances for Colchester.

Style of play
Chesters is described as a "livewire attacking midfielder capable of opening up the tightest of defences".

Career statistics

References

External links
 
 West Ham United Profile

2002 births
Living people
Footballers from Hertfordshire
English footballers
Association football midfielders
West Ham United F.C. players
Sportspeople from Hitchin
Premier League players
Colchester United F.C. players
English Football League players